Swetha Ashok is an Indian playback singer, who is well known for her work in the Malayalam film industry. She rose to fame as a child when she won the reality show Munch Star Singer (2008). She was one of the finalists on the reality show SaReGaMaPa Keralam, the Malayalam regional version of the flagship show of Zee Entertainment Enterprises. During the course of the show, Swetha launched her playback singing career by singing songs for prominent films like Mammooty's Shylock, Happy Sardar, and Dhamaka by music director Gopi Sundar.

Biography 
Swetha was born in Vadakara, Calicut. She currently lives with her parents and brother in Cochin, Kerala. She has one elder sister and a brother. Swetha's brother Vishnu Ashok is an aspiring violinist and a music director. Swetha's sister Aswathi Ashok is a lyricist and a businesswoman, owner of the jewellery line AASH.

Career 
Swetha is a trained classical singer and a B high grade artiste in All India Radio. She trained under Guru T. Ramachandran Namboothiri and Guru Vaikom Jayachandran Namboothiri. She participated in the reality show Munch Star Singer in 2008 and subsequently was crowned the winner. Post her rise to fame as a child, Swetha has done over 500 concerts across India, USA, Canada, Singapore and the Middle East. She was an Asst. Professor of Computer Science and an online music instructor at NotesNBeats, California before she once again participated in a reality show SaReGaMaPa Keralam in 2019. During the course of her show, she landed singing opportunities with well known music directors like Gopi Sundar and Shaan Rahman.

On 26 August 2020, Swetha released her first original song, called "Chingaponpulari". The song is an Onam special featuring Swetha as the artiste. The music was done by her brother Vishnu Ashok and the lyrics have been penned by her sister Aswathi Ashok. The song immediately trended after the release with multiple media platforms covering it and lauding the family for their joint venture. Produced under their family's banner, the song has been jointly produced by KP Ashokan and Jyothi Ashok. The song was released online by Sujatha Mohan who appreciated Swetha on her maiden original with a note of encouragement.

Swetha released her second single on 1 November 2020. The romantic number "Neeye" was the second venture of the sibling trio with Vishnu Ashok composing the music and Aswathi Ashok penning the lyrics for the same.

As playback singer 
All Songs are in Malayalam, unless otherwise noted.

Television shows

References

External links
https://timesofindia.indiatimes.com/tv/news/malayalam/i-quit-my-teaching-job-for-music-says-sa-re-ga-ma-pa-keralam-contestant-swetha-ashok/articleshow/70466437.cms
https://www.exchange4media.com/industry-briefing-news/saregamapa-keralam-contestants-song-for-shylock-crosses-1m-views-on-youtube-102274.html
https://malayalilife.com/channel/interview/swetha-ashok-sharing-the-lockdown--days-10823.html
https://www.indiantelevision.com/release/y2k10/feb/febrel51.php
https://timesofindia.indiatimes.com/tv/news/malayalam/sa-re-ga-ma-pa-keralam-contestants-turn-playback-singers-this-onam/articleshow/70910794.cms

Living people
Singers from Kerala
Indian women playback singers
Malayalam playback singers
21st-century Indian singers
21st-century Indian women singers
Year of birth missing (living people)